François R. Bouchet is a French astronomer specializing in physical cosmology, including formation of large scale structures and cosmic background radiation. He serves as the Institut d'Astrophysique de Paris liaison for the Planck Mission Project.

See also 
 Eurasian Astronomical Society

References

External links
 The Planck Science Team. www.rssd.esa.int
 www.sai.msu.su

21st-century French astronomers
Members of the Eurasian Astronomical Society
Living people
Year of birth missing (living people)